ECT may refer to:

Educational institutions 
 École Canadienne de Tunis, a school in Tunis, Tunisia
 Emirates College of Technology, in Abu Dhabi

Government and politics 
 Catalan Workers' Left, a defunct political party in France
 Correios, the Brazilian postal service and postal administration
 Election Commission of Thailand, the election management body of Thailand
 Energy Charter Treaty, an international agreement guaranteeing investors in energy projects

Medicine and psychology 
 Ecarin clotting time
 Ectomesenchymal chondromyxoid tumor
 Electroconvulsive therapy
 Elementary cognitive task
 Emission computed tomography
 Expectation confirmation theory

Religion 
 Eternal conscious torment, a view of Hell in Christianity
 Evangelicals and Catholics Together, an ecumenical document

Technology 
 ECN-capable transport, a transport layer capable of using Explicit Congestion Notification
 Eddy-current testing
 Edge crush test
 Electrical capacitance tomography
 Electronically controlled transmission, a type of vehicle automatic transmission
 Elementary comparison testing
 European Centre of Technology

Transportation 
 Ealing Community Transport, an English bus operator
 East Chicago Transit, in Illinois, United States
 Eastern Continental Trail, in eastern North America
 Emergency Crew Transport, CalFire's newer version of Crew Carrying Vehicle (CCV) in California, United States

Other uses 
 Ecuador Time (UTC−5), standard time zone
 ECT (TV programme), a 1985 British music programme